Biathlon at the 2002 Winter Paralympics consisted of six events, three for men and three for women.

Medal table

Medal summary 

Men
 7.5 km 
 Sitting
 Standing
 Visually impaired

Women
 7.5 km 
 Sitting
 Standing
 Visually impaired

Men's events

Women's events

See also
Biathlon at the 2002 Winter Olympics

References 

 

Paralympics - Biathlon results, deseretnews.com 

2002 Winter Paralympics events
2002
Paralympics
Biathlon competitions in the United States